Puyhuan (possibly from Quechua for heart of an animal) is a  mountain in the Cordillera Blanca in the Andes of Peru. It is situated in the Ancash Region, Huari Province, Chavín de Huantar District. Puyhuan lies northwest of Huaracayoc, northeast of Yanarahu and southeast of Tuctu.

Sources 

Mountains of Peru
Mountains of Ancash Region